Wollaston Islands may refer to:

 Wollaston Islands, south of Chile near Cape Horn
 Wollaston Islands (Nunavut)
 Wollaston Island (Western Australia), off the Kimberley coast